, there were 100,000 electric vehicles in Austria, equivalent to 2% of all vehicles in the country. , 13.9% of new cars registered in Austria were electric.

, the Tesla Model Y was the best-selling electric car in Austria.

Government policy
, the Austrian government offers subsidies of up to €5,000 for electric car purchases.

Charging stations
, there were around 15,000 public charging stations in Austria.

By state

Carinthia
, 11.8% of new cars registered in Carinthia were electric.

Lower Austria
, there were 20,000 electric vehicles registered in Lower Austria, equivalent to 1.4% of vehicles in the state.

Salzburg
, 17% of new cars registered in Salzburg were electric.

Vienna
, there were 500 public charging stations in Vienna.

Vorarlberg
, 17% of new cars registered in Vorarlberg were electric.

References

 
Austria
Road transport in Austria